{{DISPLAYTITLE:Prostaglandin D2 synthase}}

Prostaglandin-H2 D-isomerase (PTGDS) is an enzyme that in humans is encoded by the PTGDS gene.

Function 

The protein encoded by this gene is a glutathione-independent prostaglandin D synthase that catalyzes the conversion of prostaglandin H2 (PGH2) to prostaglandin D2 (PGD2). PGD2 functions as a neuromodulator as well as a trophic factor in the central nervous system. PGD2 is also involved in smooth muscle contraction/relaxation and is a potent inhibitor of platelet aggregation. This gene is preferentially expressed in brain. Studies with transgenic mice over-expressing this gene suggest that this gene may be also involved in the regulation of non-rapid eye movement sleep. Furthermore, PTGDS and its product PGD2 are elevated in the bald-scalp areas of men with male pattern baldness (androgenetic alopecia).

Clinical use 

Prostaglandin D2 synthase is used clinically as a diagnostic marker for liquorrhea, that is, to check whether fluid leaking from the nose or ear contains cerebrospinal fluid. This is important in the assessment of head trauma severity. In a medical context, the older term "beta-trace protein" is frequently used to refer to PTGDS.

See also 
 Hematopoietic prostaglandin D synthase

References

Further reading

External links 
 
 

Lipocalins